The St Marys Football Club, nicknamed, Saints, formed in 1952, is an Australian rules football club, affiliated to the Northern Territory Football League. It is famous for its record of success, with 33 NTFL premierships in 52 Grand Finals and 67 out of 70 possible final appearances. To the end of season 2021/22, St Marys have played 1297 games for 935 Wins 351 Losses and 11 Draws.

Nicknamed the Saints, St Marys play their home games at Football Park in Marrara.

St Marys has produced many talented players, particularly Indigenous Australian players for leagues such as the Australian Football League. Many players from the Tiwi Bombers Football Club also played for the club.

St Mary's have only missed the NTFL finals three times in their proud history, the seasons they missed were in 1979/80 (5th), 2000/01 (5th) and 2018/19 (8th). They manage to collect their first wooden spoon in 2018/19. The longest wooden spoon drought in NTFL history (67 years). Second is Nightcliff Football Club from 1952/53 - 1992/93 (40 Years).

Notable players
The club has produced AFL players such as Maurice Rioli, Michael Long, Ronnie Burns, Scott Chisolm, Xavier Clarke, Raphael Clarke, Peter Burgoyne, Cyril Rioli, Daniel Rioli, Shaun Edwards, Austin Wonaeamirri, Ben Long and Maurice Rioli Jr

Club achievements

Club song
Chorus:Oh when the Saints come marching inOh When the Saints come marching inOh lord I want to be in that numberWhen the Saints come marching in(Chorus)We are travelling the footstepsOf those who've gone beforeBut we'll all be reunitedOn a new and sunlit shore(Chorus)Some days in this world of troubleIs the only one we needBut I’m waiting for that morningwhen the new world is revealed(Chorus x2)''

External links

Official Facebook
Full Points Footy Profile

Sport in Darwin, Northern Territory
Australian rules football clubs in the Northern Territory
1952 establishments in Australia
Australian rules football clubs established in 1952